Olympic Organizing Committee or the Organizing Committee of the Olympics (or alternatively Olympic Organising Committee or the Organising Committee of the Olympics) may refer to:

Atlanta Committee for the Olympic Games
Athens Organizing Committee for the Olympic Games
Beijing Organizing Committee for the Olympic Games, 2008
Beijing Organising Committee for the 2022 Olympic and Paralympic Winter Games, 2022
Lillehammer Olympic Organizing Committee
London Organising Committee of the Olympic and Paralympic Games
Los Angeles Olympic Organizing Committee
Nagano Olympic Organizing Committee
Organizing Committee of the Olympic and Paralympic Games Rio 2016
PyeongChang Organizing Committee for the 2018 Olympic & Paralympic Winter Games
Salt Lake Organizing Committee for the Olympic and Paralympic Winter Games of 2002
Seoul Olympic Organizing Committee
Sochi 2014 Olympic and Paralympic Organizing Committee
Tokyo Organising Committee of the Olympic and Paralympic Games
Vancouver Organizing Committee for the 2010 Olympic and Paralympic Winter Games

See also
International Olympic Committee
List of IOC country codes
President of the Organising Committee for the Olympic Games